Baringo East Constituency was a former electoral constituency in Kenya. It was one of three constituencies in Baringo District, Rift Valley Province. The constituency was established for the 1963 elections. The constituency had nine wards, all electing councillors for the Baringo County Council.

Members of Parliament

Wards

References 

Baringo County
Constituencies in Rift Valley Province
1963 establishments in Kenya
Constituencies established in 1963
Former constituencies of Kenya